Antônio Toledo Filho (born 5 October 1953) is a Brazilian boxer. He competed in the men's flyweight event at the 1976 Summer Olympics.

References

External links
 

1953 births
Living people
Brazilian male boxers
Olympic boxers of Brazil
Boxers at the 1976 Summer Olympics
Sportspeople from São Paulo
Flyweight boxers